Féraud or Feraud may refer to:
 M. Feraud, a French diplomat of the 18th century who went on a mission to resume official French East India Company contacts with Burma in 1769
 Albert Féraud (1921–2008), a French sculptor
 Anselm Féraud de Glandèves, a bishop in the ancient Diocese of Glandèves (1309 or 1316–1327 or 1328)
 Antoine Féraud, an actor in the 1895 Partie de cartes documentary film
 Daniel Feraud (born 1953), an Argentine fencer
 Hadrien Feraud (1984-), a French jazz-fusion bassist
 Jean Bertrand Féraud (1759–1795) (fr), a deputy killed during the Prairial uprising during the French Revolution
 Jean Desire Feraud, a French vine planter in the Central Otago Wine Region, in New Zealand
 Jean-François Féraud (1725–1807), a French lexicographer (Dictionnaire critique de la langue française)
 J.-L. Féraud (1750–1809), a member of the French Egyptian Institute of Sciences and Arts
 Louis Féraud (1921–1999), a French fashion designer and artist
 Raymond Féraud, a Middle-Ages monk who composed a mythological life of Honoratus, Archbishop of Arles
 Fictional characters
 a character in Le Roi d'Yvestot in The Little Theatre of Jean Renoir series
 Gabriel Féraud, a hussard in the 1977 Ridley Scott The Duellists film